Biggar may refer to:

Geography

Canada 
 Biggar, Saskatchewan, Canada, a town
 Rural Municipality of Biggar No. 347, Saskatchewan, Canada
 Biggar Lake, Algonquin Provincial Park, Ontario
 Biggar (electoral district), a provincial electoral district since 2002
 Biggar (former provincial electoral district), a provincial electoral district from 1912 to 1995

United Kingdom 
 Biggar, Cumbria, England, a village
 Biggar, South Lanarkshire, Scotland, a town and former burgh
 Biggar Water, a minor river in Scotland and tributary of the River Tweed

People 
 Biggar (surname)
 Biggar family, Alexander Harvey Biggar (1781–1838) and his sons Robert and George, pioneer traders at Port Natal
 Baldwin of Biggar, 12th century Scots magnate

Transportation 
 Biggar Airport, Saskatchewan, Canada
 Biggar station, a heritage railway station operated by Via Rail in Saskatchewan, Canada
 Biggar (Scotland) railway station, a former station on the Symington, Biggar and Broughton Railway

Other uses 
 Biggar Museum Trust
 Biggar RFC, a rugby club in Scotland

See also 
 Rosetown—Biggar (federal electoral district), federal electoral district from 1935 to 1968
 Rosetown–Biggar (provincial electoral district), a former provincial electoral district
 Saskatoon—Biggar, federal electoral district from 1968 to 1978
 Saskatoon—Rosetown—Biggar, federal electoral district since 1997
 Bigga (disambiguation)
 Bigger (disambiguation)